The Champlain Handicap was an American Thoroughbred horse race for horses age three and older first run in 1901 at Saratoga Race Course in Saratoga Springs, New York. Placed on hiatus in 1945, it was revived in 1954 at Jamaica Racetrack as a sprint race restricted to fillies and mares. The race was discontinued after the 1957 running.

Historic notes
The first running of the Champlain Handicap took place on August 27, 1901.

On August 29, 1907 Dandelion won the Champlain Handicap for the second straight year. He would be the only horse to ever win the race more than once.

In winning the 1919 edition of the Champlain Handicap, Willis Sharpe Kilmer's top runner Sun Briar broke Saratoga's track record for the mile and one-eighth distance on dirt with a time of 1:50 flat. In so doing, he defeated his stablemate and future Hall of Fame
inductee, Exterminator. The following year Exterminator returned to compete in the 1920 running of the Champlain only to finish second again, this time to Gnome.

The 1938 Champlain Handicap was the fifth race on the card. It was preceded by the Rockton Handicap, a race named in honor of the 1901 inaugural winner of the Champlain. 

Due to World War II, in May, 1942 the United States government's Office of Price Administration implemented gasoline rationing on seventeen East Coast states which included New York.  Saratoga Springs Race Course relied upon a good attendance rate from New York city racing fans willing to make the 360 mile return trip but rationing would impact that for users of motor vehicles as well as passenger trains. As a result, the important Saratoga stakes races would be shifted to Belmont Park on densely populated Long Island in 1943 and 1944 where it was run as an event for three-year-old horses. The Champlain Handicap would never return to Saratoga.

Records
Speed record: (Jamaica Racetrack)
 1:11.00 @ 6 furlongs: Oil Painting (1955) & Gandharva (1956)

Speed record: (Saratoga Race Course)
 1:50.00 @ 1-1/8 miles: Sun  Briar (1919)

Most wins:
 2 - Dandelion (1906, 1907)

Most wins by a jockey:
 2 - George M. Odom (1902, 1904)
 2 - Frank Keogh (1920, 1921)
 2 - Laverne Fator (1928, 1932)
 2 - Don Meade (1933, 1934)

Most wins by a trainer:
 3 - Henry E. McDaniel (1919, 1931, 1933)
 3 - Thomas J. Healey (1905, 1910, 1927)
 3 - John E. Madden (1906, 1907, 1908)

Most wins by an owner:
 4 - Harry P. Whitney  (1914, 1923, 1924, 1928)

Winners

 † Blue Sparkler finished first but was disqualified for interfering with runner-up Gandharva.

References

Flat horse races for three-year-olds
Jamaica Race Course
Belmont Park
Saratoga Race Course
Discontinued horse races in New York (state)
Recurring sporting events established in 1901
Recurring sporting events disestablished in 1958